Tunisia–European Union relations are the foreign relations between the country of Tunisia and the European Union.

Trade
The EU is Tunisia's largest trading partner.  More than 75% of Tunisia's exports go to the EU and more than half of Tunisia's imports come from the EU.  The total trade in goods between the EU and Tunisia in 2017 amounted to €20.5 billion.

Funding and Assistance
Tunisia receives some of the largest amount of money from the European Neighborhood Instrument out of all the participating countries with a "focus on different sectors such as the economy and the business environment; education, training and research; culture and media; migration and asylum; justice, freedom and security; environment, climate change and energy.".  In addition to funding for migrant relief, Tunisia benefits from several other EU funding projects such as the European Instrument for Democracy and Human Rights, Instrument contributing to Stability and Peace, and the Development Cooperation Instrument (DCI). Tunisia is also a member of the Erasmus+ program and an associate member of Horizon 2020.  Flows of foreign direct investment to Tunisia are also concentrated on the development of the infrastructure network as well as of the textiles and clothing sectors.

Chronology of relations with the EU

References

 
Tunisia
European Union